Events in the year 1820 in India.

Events
National income - ₹11,684 million

Law
Divorce Bills Evidence Act (British statute)

Births 

 26 September – Ishwar Chandra Vidyasagar, the "Father of Bengali prose", educator and social reformer (died 1891)

1820 in India
History of India